Miggy may refer to:

People
 nickname of Miguel Almirón (born 1994), Paraguayan professional footballer
 nickname of Miguel Andújar (born 1995), Dominican Republic professional baseball player
 nickname of Margherita Miggy Biller, British mathematics teacher
 nickname of Miguel Cabrera (born 1983), Venezuelan professional baseball player
 nickname of Miguel Montero (born 1983), Venezuelan former professional baseball player
 Miggy Cancel, a contestant on the reality TV series The Biggest Loser (season 9)
 Miggy Chavez, a member of the Filipino rock band Chicosci
 Miggy Littleton, a member of the American indie rock band Blood on the Wall
 Miggy (singer), Dutch pop singer Marina van der Rijk (1961–2012)

Other uses
 Miggy, a character in the British comic strip The Gambols
 nickname for the Amiga computer

See also
 Paul Migy (1814–1879), Swiss politician

Lists of people by nickname